Satha I (also spelled Sattha; ; 1539–1596), also known as Barom Reachea IV, was the Cambodian king ruled from 1576 to 1584. He was the eldest son of Barom Reachea III.

During his reign, Blas Ruiz and Diogo Veloso came to Cambodia, both were trusted by the king and married Cambodian princesses.

Two inscriptions in Angkor Wat indicated that some temples were restorated with the help of the royal family in 1577–1578. Satha I abdicated in favor of his son Chey Chettha I in 1584.

Siamese had recovered their capital from the Burmese, and started to take revenge on Cambodia. In 1594, the Cambodian capital Lovek was under siege. Ruiz and Veloso were sent to Manila for assistance. Before they returned, the capital was sacked by Siamese. Satha was forced to flee and seek refuge in Lan Xang. He later died in Vientiane.

References

1539 births
1596 deaths
16th-century Cambodian monarchs